The Swiss Path is a special national path in central Switzerland opened in 1991, in the cantons of Uri and Schwyz.

It makes a loop around the Urnersee, the southern arm of Lake Lucerne. The trail starts at the Rütli: the meadow where, according to tradition, the oath of allegiance forming the original Swiss Confederacy was taken in 1291. It then passes through Bauen, Flüelen, Sisikon (location of the Tellskapelle) and Morschach, finishing at Brunnen.

Uniquely, each canton received a portion of the trail to design, proportional to its population in 1991. The cantons' sections appear on the trail in the order in which they joined the Swiss confederation.

External links
 http://www.weg-der-schweiz.ch/en/
Route description at SwitzerlandMobility

Hiking trails in Switzerland
1991 establishments in Switzerland